Belaval is a surname. Notable people with this surname include:

 Edgar Belaval (1910–1989), Puerto Rican lawyer
 Emilio Belaval Maldonado (1903–1972), Puerto Rican lawyer
 Emilio S. Belaval (1903–1973), Puerto Rican lawyer and writer
 Eugenio S. Belaval (1925–1999), Puerto Rican law professor
 Joseph S. Belaval (1879–1953), Puerto Rican obstetrician
 Philippe Bélaval (born 1955), French army official
  (1910–1989), French philosopher